West Dereham is a village and civil parish in the English county of Norfolk.
For the purposes of local government, it falls within the district of King's Lynn and West Norfolk.

St Mary's Abbey, West Dereham, was founded in 1188 by Hubert Walter, Dean of York, at his birthplace.

Abbey and West Dereham railway station was on the line between Downham Market and Stoke Ferry.

Church of St Andrew
The church of St Andrew is a Grade I listed building. It is one of 124 existing round-tower churches in Norfolk.

Notes

External links

Saint Andrews Church

Information from Genuki Norfolk on West Dereham.
St Andrew's on the European Round Tower Churches website
West Dereham Village Hall

Villages in Norfolk
King's Lynn and West Norfolk
Civil parishes in Norfolk